Adams v. Tanner, 244 U.S. 590 (1917), was a United States Supreme Court case in which the Court held that a Washington state law that prohibited employment agencies was unconstitutional.

Facts
Washington voters passed a ballot initiative, supported by the then Federal Department of Labor, to prohibit private employment agencies charging fees to people seeking work. It read as follows,

The constitutionality of the law was challenged.

Judgment

Majority
Chief Justice White, Justices Day, Van Devanter, Pitney and McReynold held that a ban would breach the principle of due process of law in the deprivation of liberty and property. The ban was arbitrary and oppressive. Mr Justice Reynold said,

Dissent
Justice Brandeis (with whom Justice Holmes, Clarke and McKenna dissented) laid out in his dissenting judgment why employment agency activities were a legitimate concern. He highlighted sources from US Labor Department giving examples of abuse, attempts in over thirty states to regulate and have free public agencies compete. He stated how all methods short of abolition had ultimately failed (601-9).

In this period, the practice of charging destitute workers upfront fees for finding work was widespread. People might give up their last pennies for the chance of work. Sometimes, agencies made no effort to place the worker, or the work would last a few days and the employer would then split the next fee with the agent to bring in fresh replacements. Justice Brandeis cited from a report to a 1912 Congress Committee.

Mr Justice Holmes and Mr Justice Clarke concurred.

Importance

International Labour Organization policy

Probably inspired by the dissenting judgments in this case, the International Labour Organization's first ever Recommendation took on the views of Justice Brandeis. The Unemployment Recommendation, 1919 (No.1), Art. 1 called for each member to,

The Unemployment Convention, 1919, Art. 2 instead required the alternative of,

In 1933 the Fee-Charging Employment Agencies Convention (No.34) formally called for abolition. The exception was if the agencies were licensed and a fee scale was agreed in advance. In 1949 a new revised Convention (No.96) was produced. This kept the same scheme, but secured an 'opt out' (Art.2) for members that did not wish to sign up. Agencies were an increasingly entrenched part of the labor market. The United States did not sign up to the Conventions. The latest Convention, the Private Employment Agencies Convention, 1997 takes a much softer stance and calls merely for regulation.

Supreme Court policy
In Ribnik v. McBride, 277 U.S. 350 (1928), the Court struck down a similar New Jersey law attempting to regulate agencies, Justices Stone, Brandeis and Holmes dissenting. This is probably no longer good law.

Doubt was placed on the leading dicta of Adams v. Tanner in Olsen v. State of Nebraska, 313 U.S. 236 (1941), and Lincoln Union v. Northwestern Co., 335 U.S. 525, 535 (1949). In the latter, Mr Justice Black said that Adams v. Tanner was part of the "constitutional philosophy" that struck down minimum wages and maximum working hours.

See also
List of United States Supreme Court cases, volume 244
Olsen v. Nebraska (1941)
United Kingdom agency worker law
Temporary work

Notes

External links
 
 

1917 in United States case law
United States labor case law
United States Supreme Court cases
United States Supreme Court cases of the White Court